Kenneth allein zu Haus ("Kenneth Home Alone") is the debut album by German rapper Kay One, released on 30 April 2010 via ersguterjunge. It was also released as a premium edition with three added songs, while the standard edition features 18 songs. 
The album features guest appearances of Fler, Bushido, Philippe Heithier, Frauenarzt, Nyze, and his former partner Benny Blanko.

The song "Style & das Geld" was released as a promotional single. The lead single "Ich brech die Herzen" reached No. 67 in Germany.

The album's title is based on the film Home Alone (1990), which is titled Kevin – Allein zu Haus ("Kevin – Home Alone") in Germany.

Music and production 
The album was recorded, mixed and mastered in record producer Beatzarre's studio in Berlin.
All songs were produced by Beatzarre & Djorkaeff, except "Bitte vergiess mich nicht" (produced with Leander Bauer and Philippe Heithier) "Du fehlst mir" (produced with Bushido) and "Nie vorbei" (produced with Philippe Heithier).

All the lyrics written by Kay One, except "Intro", "Style & das Geld", "Du fehlst mir" and "Outro" (written with Bushido). "Verzeih mir", "Bitte vergiss mich nicht" and "Nie vorbei" (written with Philippe Heithier). "Bis die Polizei kommt" (written with Frauenarzt), "Rockstar" (written with Nyze & Benny Blanko) and "Deine Zeit kommt" (written with Fler).

German singer-songwriter Philipper Heithier provided his vocals on four songs "Verzeih mir", "Bitte vergiess mich nicht", "Nichts ist für immer" and "Nie vorbei". Rapper and mentor Bushido is featured on two songs "Style & das Geld", credit as Sonny Black, and "Du fehlst mir" and on the intro and outro skit. "Style & das Geld" contains vocal samples from Bushido of "Carlo Cokxxx Flashback" from Carlo Cokxxx Nutten 2.

Rapper Frauenarzt is featured on "Bis die Polizei kommt". Labelmate Fler is featured on the ong "Deine Zeit kommt". The song "Rockstar" features his labelmate Nyze and Benny Blanko.

Bojan Assenov provided the piano to "Verzeih mir". Arndt Christoph performed trumpet on the song "Ein guter Tag", while the guitar and bass was performed by Marius Mahn.

Track listing

(*) The tracks 14, 17 & 18 are only featured on the Premium edition

Samples
"Style & das Geld" contains samples of "Carlo Coxxx Flashback" by Bushido & Fler (alias Sonny Black & Frank White)

References

External links
Diggedidope.wordpress.com

2010 albums
German-language albums